Al-Eṣrar is a sub-district in the At-Ta'iziyah District, Taiz Governorate, Yemen. Its population was 11,384 according to the 2004 census.

References  

Sub-districts in At-Ta'iziyah District